The 1948 Pacific typhoon season was an average season. It had no official bounds; it ran year-round in 1948, but most tropical cyclones tend to form in the northwestern Pacific Ocean between June and December. These dates conventionally delimit the period of each year when most tropical cyclones form in the northwestern Pacific Ocean.

The scope of this article is limited to the Pacific Ocean, north of the equator and west of the International Date Line. Storms that form east of the date line and north of the equator are called hurricanes; see 1948 Pacific hurricane season. At the time, tropical storms that formed within this region of the western Pacific were identified and named by the United States Armed Services, and these names are taken from the list that USAS publicly adopted before the 1945 season started.


Season summary

Storms

Typhoon Karen 
 
Typhoon Karen, one of the earliest recorded super typhoons, developed on January 11, well west of the Philippines. It curved westward while slowly intensifying. After a prolonged period of slow intensification, the tropical cyclone began to rapidly strengthen. It became a super typhoon on January 16. Shortly after, it weakened and dissipated on January 19.

It struck Yap on January 14, damaging and destroying establishments and houses on the island. It also wrecked the roofs of some U.S. warehouses and buildings, and downed power lines. A food warehouse were washed out; however, some food supplies survived.  

After the typhoon, the navy transported some relief supplies to the populated island. No deaths were reported.

Typhoon Lana 

Typhoon Lana, the second system of the season, formed on May 16, west of the Philippines. It moved to the north-northeast while intensifying, reaching its peak intensity somewhere on May 18 and 19. It then weakened, until it was last noted on May 20 as it merged with a cold front.

Warnings were issued for Yap, Palau, Guam and Ulithi in preparations for the storm. All ships in these islands were instructed to escape to Sangley Point due to the approaching typhoon. 

A plane in Guam encountered the strength of the typhoon; however, it escaped its fury. Eighteen individuals were reported dead in Yap when their canoe sank during the storm. The damage, however, was minimal.

Typhoon Mabel

Typhoon Nadine

Tropical Storm Ophelia 
Ophelia formed on June 10 in the South China Sea. It moved west and struck southern China. It dissipated the next day, without attaining maximum sustained winds any higher than 45 mph.

Typhoon Pearl

Typhoon Rose

Typhoon Bertha

Tropical Storm Chris

Typhoon Dolores–Eunice 

Tropical Storm Dolores was tracked by the Air Weather Service located on Guam. At one point, a tropical storm was identified and assigned the name Eunice. Post analysis showed that Tropical Storm Dolores was north of the forecast location and actually the system assigned the name Eunice.

Typhoon Flo

Typhoon Gertrude

Typhoon Hazel

Typhoon Ione 

A Tropical Storm formed on September 11 and soon turned toward Japan as it gained strength. Ione soon reached category 4 intensity on September 14. Ione then began to lose strength and became a category 1 on September 16. Then, Ione struck Japan in that day killing 838 people. Ione further weakened and became a Tropical Storm on the 17th. Ione then dissipated.

Typhoon Jackie

Typhoon Kit

Typhoon Libby

Typhoon Martha

Typhoon Norma

Tropical Storm Olga

Typhoon Pat

Typhoon Rita

Typhoon Agnes

Tropical Storm 24W

Typhoon Beverly

Tropical Storm 26W

Other Systems 
Between 23 July and 4 August, the name Annabell was assigned to a North West Pacific system. The Air Weather Service issued a bulletin issued and tropical cyclone named on what was later determined to be "trough activity"

Storm names 
Tropical storm names were assigned by the Joint Typhoon Warning Center since 1945.

See also 

 1948 Atlantic hurricane season
 List of Pacific typhoon seasons
 1900–1950 South-West Indian Ocean cyclone seasons
 1940s Australian region cyclone seasons
 1940s South Pacific cyclone seasons

References

External links 
 Unisys season tracks
 List of DOD publishing organizations and basins covered for the entire 1945-2000 period.

1948
1948 natural disasters
1948 meteorology
1948 in Asia
1948 in Oceania